Charlie Lindgren (born December 18, 1993) is an American professional ice hockey goaltender for the Washington Capitals of the National Hockey League (NHL).

Playing career
Lindgren began his junior career with the Sioux Falls Stampede of the USHL in 2012–13.   Lindgren played his college hockey at St. Cloud State University from 2013–14 to 2015–16.  On March 30, 2016, Lindgren decided to forego his senior year at St. Cloud State and was signed as a free agent by the Montreal Canadiens to a two-year, two way contract.

At the tail end of the 2015–16 season, Lindgren played in his first NHL game on April 7, 2016. The Canadiens won the game 4–2 against the Carolina Hurricanes.

On November 5, 2017, Lindgren won his first career shutout against the Chicago Blackhawks in a 2–0 win, while making 38 saves. He was the starting goalie of this game since Carey Price was out with an injury. On February 13, 2018, the Canadiens signed Lindgren to a three-year, $2.25 million contract extension.

On July 29, 2021, the St. Louis Blues signed Lindgren as a free agent to a one-year, two-way contract. He was assigned to AHL affiliate, the Springfield Thunderbirds to begin the  season. He was later recalled and made his debut for the Blues on December 7, 2021 when Blues goaltender Ville Husso was injured late in the third period in a game against the Florida Panthers. Entering with the score tied at 3–3, Lindgren was credited with the win having played 6 minutes and faced 3 Panther shots before the Blues won in overtime 4–3.

On July 13, 2022, Lindgren was signed as a free agent to a three-year, $3.3 million contract with the Washington Capitals.

Personal life
His brother, Ryan Lindgren is a defenseman for the New York Rangers

Career statistics

Awards and honors

References

External links
 

1993 births
Living people
AHCA Division I men's ice hockey All-Americans
American expatriate ice hockey players in Canada
American men's ice hockey goaltenders
Ice hockey players from Minnesota
Laval Rocket players
Montreal Canadiens players
People from Lakeville, Minnesota
Sioux Falls Stampede players
Springfield Thunderbirds players
St. Cloud State Huskies men's ice hockey players
St. John's IceCaps players
St. Louis Blues players
Undrafted National Hockey League players
Washington Capitals players